Catz may refer to:

 Another form of the surname "Katz"
 Safra A. Catz, an Israeli-born American businesswoman
 Caroline Catz (born Caroline Caplan), an English actress
Catz, a commune of the Manche département in France
Petz, a computer game
St Catharine's College, Cambridge, a Cambridge University college 
St Catherine's College, Oxford, an Oxford University college

See also 
 Katz (disambiguation)
 Cat

Jewish surnames